The Special Rapid Response Unit or SOBR (Spetsial'niy Otryad Bystrovo Reagirovaniya, lit. Special Unit of Quick Response), from 2002 to 2011 known as OMSN  (Otryad Militsii Spetsial'nogo Naznacheniya, Special Police Unit), is a spetsnaz unit of the National Guard of Russia.With their military equipment, uniforms and training, the OMON and SOBR constitute a rapid-reaction and rapid-insertion military force available to the regular police - normally deployable at the discretion of a police local command. They serve a similar function to a police tactical unit.

Groups named "SOBR" also operate in other post-Soviet countries - such as Kazakhstan and Kyrgyzstan.

History

SOBR was formed on February 10, 1992, and was subordinated to the "Directorate for combating the Organized Crime" under the Russian Interior Ministry (MVD). SOBR units were composed of senior-ranking police officers, better trained than the members of OMON (which is a cross between riot police and paramilitary police), and tasked with police tactical unit operations under the jurisdiction of MVD. The primary function of SOBR is to combat against organized crime, with additional roles including anti-terrorism. They also fought during the wars in Chechnya and Daghestan.

Russia's first regional SOBR units were formed on 10 February 1992, under the Ministry of Internal Affairs (MVD) within the Directorate for Combating Organized Crime, on the model of the previously established Moscow unit. SOBR units were staffed by senior-ranking police officers and typically received better training than the members of OMON, the paramilitary special police units of the MVD; their personnel was drawn from the OMON units. They carried out police tactical unit operations under the jurisdiction of the MVD, including the apprehension of dangerous criminals and high-profile raids, while also participating in conventional warfare such the Chechen Wars.

On 16 September 2002, SOBR was dissolved and its units were reclassified as OMSN, becoming subordinated to the regional criminal police offices, and since the establishment of the Investigative Committee of Russia, has co-operated with federal investigative authorities. Due to the similarity in function as OMSN, and the popularity of the SOBR name, OMSN was commonly referred to as "SOBR" and the terms were often used interchangeably despite SOBR being officially non-existent.

In 2007, in Russia there were 87 OMSN units, counting over 5,000 officers stationed in major Russian cities, the most famous unit of the formation is OMSN "Rys" (lynx, Cyrillic ОМСН "Рысь"), established in 1992, which since its inception participated in almost all known special operations in Russia.

In 2011 OMSN units were renamed OSN, but in 2012 the SOBR name returned into existence during reforms of the MVD, as all special forces units under the ministry's command were renamed from OMSN to SOBR.

SOBR placed 1st in the 2015 Annual Warrior Competition held annually in Jordan. Other teams participating were a U.S. Marine Corps Special Operations Battalion and China's Assault Hawk Commando Unit of the People's Armed Police, which placed second overall. Overall 37 teams from 18 different nations participated in the event.

On 5 April 2016, following the establishment of the National Guard of Russia, the Internal Troops of Russia were disestablished and the command of their units, including SOBR, was transferred from the MVD to the National Guard. According to a statement by General Zolotov, troops from OMON and SOBR received the status of military personnel in 2018.p. 20

SOBR units participated in the 2022 Russian invasion of Ukraine where they were intended to disperse riots after Kyiv and other major Ukrainian cities were captured. The failure to capture Kyiv resulted in some SOBR missions becoming redundant, and some of its personnel being killed in action or captured by the Ukrainian Armed Forces. At the Battle of Irpin, due overly optimistic operational plans and the lack of communications with other units, an unarmored and under-equipped SOBR unit from the Kemerovo Oblast ended up separated from the main Army forces and accidentally spearheading the assault on the city, getting ambushed at a bridge over the Irpin river. Reportedly of the 80 SBOR and OMON officers in the convoy, only 3 survived.

Mission 
SOBR units are focused on urban public security actions, and fight against organized crime gangs in urban environments or in circumstances where the rules of engagement are strict. SOBR units are also deployed in custom police operations, in order to provide a heavy cordon. Large scale counterterror operations usually involve SOBR, spetsnaz, OMON and FSB units due to the large personnel demands.

Notable SOBR Teams 
 
Every SOBR unit has an individual character. According to National Interest, the level of equipment of a SOBR team depends on the level of wealth of the relevant region. 
 Kaliningrad Oblast: SOBR “Viking”
 Novgorod Oblast: SOBR “Rubin” ("Ruby" or "sardius")
 Moscow Oblast: SOBR “Bulat” ("Damascus steel" or "sword made of Damascus steel")
 Saint Petersburg: SOBR “Granit” (Granite)
 Chechnya: SOBR “Terek” (Referring to the Terek River)
 Crimea: SOBR "Khalzan" ("Golden eagle")

See also
Rus (special forces)
Vityaz (MVD)
Spetznaz

References

Law enforcement in Russia
National Guard of Russia
Police tactical units
Special forces of Russia